Yuenü was a swordswoman from the state of Yue, in the modern Chinese province of Zhejiang. She is also known as Maiden of the Southern Forest. 

In Chinese mythology, she is a reincarnation of Jiutian Xuannü.

Life and legacy
Yuenü lived during the reign of Goujian of Yue (496-465 BCE). From a young age, she learned archery and how to use a sword by hunting with her father. The King of Yue planned to attack the state of Wu and when he heard about her skills, he invited her to court. Along the way, she was challenged by an old man who was in reality a magic white ape:

Upon meeting the king, the Maiden reveals the secret to her fighting ability is the application of yin and yang energy, which are metaphorically described as the opening and closing of large and small swinging doors. Furthermore, she claims that, while strengthening the spirit, one should remain outwardly calm.

Her exposition on the art of the sword impressed the king, who decreed that her skills be in training his army and gave her the title 'the Yue Woman' (越女) or Lady of Yue. The king appointed her to train his army officers, who in turn, instructed his army.

Hers is the earliest known exposition on the art of the sword, and influenced Chinese martial arts for generations.

See also
Sword of the Yue Maiden

References

Chinese swordsmanship
Fictional characters from Zhejiang